Fatululic (Fatu-Lulik, Fatululik) is a village and suco in Fatululic Subdistrict, Cova Lima District, East Timor. The suco has 549 inhabitants.

The word fatululic formed by two words fatuk=stone and lulic=sacred/holy. Literarlly fatululic is holy stone or sacred stone.

References 

Populated places in East Timor
Cova Lima Municipality